Julián Juderías y Loyot (16 September 1877 – 19 June 1918) was a Spanish historian, sociologist, literary critic, journalist, translator and interpreter.

Biography 

Juderías was born in Madrid to a prominent an cultured family. His father, Mariano Juderías, was a well-known historical author and translator. His mother was French. At 17, he began work with the Spanish Ministry of State. In 1900, after the death of his father, he moved to Paris to attend the School of Eastern Languages. There and in Leipzig and Odesa he studied French, German, Russian and other languages. His main work was a study about the concept of "Black Legend", in which he denounced the tendentious, nonobjective historical writing or propaganda about Spain, its people and its culture.

During the First World War, he served in King Alfonso XIII's European War Office.

Years after his death, Juderías' works greatly influenced Spanish conservative thinkers such as Ramiro de Maeztu and José María de Areilza.

Bibliography

History 
Un proceso político en tiempos de Felipe III: don Rodrigo Calderón, marqués de Siete Iglesias; su vida, su proceso y su muerte, Madrid, Tip. de la Rev. de Archivos, 1906.
Los favoritos de Felipe III: don Pedro Franqueza, conde de Villalonga y Secretario de Estado, Madrid, Imprenta de la Revista de Archivos, 1909
España en tiempos de Carlos II el Hechizado: obra que obtuvo el Premio Charro Hidalgo en el concurso abierto por el Ateneo de Madrid en 1908-1910, Madrid, Tip. de la Revista de Archivos, 1912
Don Gaspar Melchor de Jovellanos: su vida, su tiempo, sus obras, su influencia social: obra premiada por la Real Academia de Ciencias Morales y Políticas, Madrid, Imp. de J. Ratés, 1913
"La leyenda negra y la verdad histórica: España en Europa, trabajo premiado por La Ilustración Española y Americana en el concurso de 1913", La Ilustración Española y Americana, Madrid, enero-febrero de 1914
La leyenda negra y la verdad histórica: contribución al estudio del concepto de España en Europa, de las causas de este concepto y de la tolerancia política y religiosa en los países civilizados, Madrid, Tip. de la Revista de Archivos, 1914
Gibraltar: apuntes para la historia de la pérdida de esta plaza, de los sitios que le pusieron los españoles y de las negociaciones entre España e Inglaterra referentes a su restitución:1704-1796, Madrid, Tip. de la Rev. de Archivos, 1915
La leyenda negra: estudios acerca del concepto de España en el Extranjero: segunda edición completamente refundida, aumentada y provista de nuevas indicaciones bibliográficas, Barcelona, Araluce, 1917
La reconstrucción de la historia de España desde el punto de vista nacional: discursos leídos ante la Real Academia de la Historia en el acto de su recepción pública por el Excmo. Sr. don Julián Juderías y Loyot y por el Excmo. Sr. don Jerónimo Bécker y González, académico de número, el día 28 de abril de 1918, Madrid, Imprenta Clásica Española, 1918
Don Francisco de Quevedo y Villegas: la época, el hombre, las doctrinas: obra premiada con accésit por la Real Academia de Ciencias Morales y Políticas en el concurso ordinario de 1917, Madrid, Establecimiento Tipográfico de Jaime Ratés, 1923

Sociology 
El obrero y la ley obrera en Rusia, Madrid, Ministerio de Estado, 1903, Madrid, Ministerio de Estado, 1903, published in Gaceta de Madrid (24 June 1903)
La miseria y la criminalidad en las grandes ciudades de Europa y América, Madrid, Imp. de Arias, 1906
La protección a la infancia en el Extranjero, Madrid, Imp. de Arias. 1908
Los hombres inferiores: estudio acerca del pauperismo en los grandes centros de población, Madrid, 1909, vol. VII de la Biblioteca de Ciencias Penales
La reglamentación de la prostitución y la trata de blancas, Madrid,1909
Le Patronage Royal pour la repression de la traite des blanches et le Congrès de la Fédération Abolitioniste Internationale (Genève septembre 1908), Madrid, Suc. de Minuesa de los Ríos, 1908
El problema de la mendicidad: medios prácticos de resolverlo, memoria que obtuvo el Premio del Ministro de la Gobernación en el concurso abierto en 1908 por la Sociedad Española de Higiene, Madrid, 1909
Le petit crédit urbain et rural en Espagne, Bruxelles, Comité International de l’Association pour l’étude des problèmes des classes moyennes, 1909
El problema del abolicionismo, memoria presentada al Congreso de la Asociación Española para el progreso de las Ciencias celebrado en Valencia, Madrid, 1909
Los tribunales para niños: medios de implantarlos en España, ponencia presentada al Consejo Superior de Protección a la Infancia y publicada por éste, Madrid, 1910
La trata de blancas: estudio de este problema en España y en el Extranjero, memoria premiada por la Sociedad Española de Higiene en el concurso de 1910, Madrid, 1911
La higiene y su influencia en la legislación, memoria premiada por la Sociedad Española de Higiene en su concurso de 1911, Madrid, 1911
La infancia abandonada: leyes e instituciones protectoras, memoria premiada por la Real Academia de Ciencias Morales y Políticas en el consurso de la fundación del señor d. José Santa María de Hita, Madrid, Imp. de J. Ratés, 1912
La juventud delincuente: leyes e instituciones que tienden a su regeneración, memoria premiada por la Real Academia de Ciencias Morales y Políticas, Madrid, Imp. de J. Ratés, 1912
Recueil des lois et ordonnances en vigueur pour la répression de la traite des blanches dans les principaux pays d’Europe et d’Amérique: fait au nom du Patronage Royal Espagnol pour la Repression de la Traite des Blanches, Madrid, Imp. Suc. de M. Minuesa de los Ríos, 1913
Mendicidad y vagancia, ponencia para la Asamblea Nacional de Protección a la Infancia y represión de la mendicidad, 13-18 de abril de 1914; sección 3ª, Madrid, Imp. del Asilo de Huérfanos, 1914
El problema de la infancia obrera en España, publicación de la Sección Española de la Asociación Internacional para la Protección Legal de los Trabajadores, Madrid, 1917
Problemas de la infancia delincuente: la criminalidad, el tribunal, el reformatorio, Biblioteca “Pro-Infantia”, Madrid, 1917.

Politics 
Rusia contemporánea: estudios acerca de su situación actual, Madrid, Imp. de Fortanet, 1904

References

External links 

 

1877 births
1918 deaths
Writers from Madrid
20th-century Spanish historians
Spanish sociologists
Spanish literary critics
20th-century Spanish journalists
Spanish translators
Historians of Spain
Bulgarian–Spanish translators
Croatian–Spanish translators
English–Spanish translators
German–Spanish translators
Portuguese–Spanish translators
Russian–Spanish translators
Serbian–Spanish translators
Swedish–Spanish translators
19th-century translators
Interpreters
Deaths from Spanish flu
Burials at Cementerio de la Almudena
Spanish people of French descent